The 2021 Central Arkansas Bears football team represented the University of Central Arkansas in the 2021 NCAA Division I FCS football season as a member of the ASUN Conference. The Bears were led by fourth-year head coach Nathan Brown and played their home games at Estes Stadium.

The ASUN Conference and Western Athletic Conference announced the formation of the WAC-ASUN Challenge (AQ7) for the 2021 season on February 23, 2021.  The Challenge included the four fully qualified Division I (FCS) members of the WAC (Abilene Christian, Lamar, Sam Houston, and Stephen F. Austin) and Central Arkansas, Eastern Kentucky, and Jacksonville State of the ASUN Conference.  The winner of the challenge received an auto-bid to the NCAA Division I FCS football playoffs.

Previous season

The Bears finished the 2020–21 season with 5–4 overall record, 0–0 in Southland.

Schedule

References

Central Arkansas
Central Arkansas Bears football seasons
Central Arkansas Bears football